This is a comparison of the characteristics of tanks used in World War I.

Tanks used in World War I

Immediate post-war tanks
Tanks planned for production and with completed prototypes during the war, but entered service after it ended.

See also
 Comparison of early World War II tanks
 History of the tank

Notes

References
 
 
 
 

Tanks

pl:Czołgi I wojny światowej